A cleaner is an industrial or domestic worker who cleans.

Cleaner(s) or The Cleaner(s) may also refer to:

Cleaning
 Cleaning agent, a substance used to remove dirt, stains, etc.
 Cleanser, a product used to cleanse, such as a facial cleanser
 Dry cleaning, a textile cleaning process

People
 "The Cleaner", a nickname of Canadian wrestler Kenny Omega

Arts, entertainment, and media

Fictional characters
 Victor, The Cleaner from La Femme Nikita, also featured in the remake Point of No Return (1993 film)
 Cleaners, a fictional group of contract killers in the video game Max Payne 2: The Fall of Max Payne
 The Cleaner, an Afghani character in Hyena Road (2015) 
 Winston Wolf, also known as The Cleaner, in the film Pulp Fiction (1994)
 Léon Montana refers to himself as a cleaner as a euphemism for hitman in Léon: The Professional (1994)

Film
 Cleaner (film), a 2007 thriller starring Samuel L. Jackson
 Code Name: The Cleaner, a 2007 film starring Cedric the Entertainer
 The Cleaner (2012 film), a 2012 Peruvian film
 The Cleaners (2018 film), a 2018 documentary film about social media moderation, that won 7 documentary film awards at film festivals
 The Cleaner (2021 film), with Lynda Carter

Television
 Cleaners (TV series), a 2013 made-for-Crackle series starring Emily Osment
 Cleaners (Charmed), a type of fictional being in the TV series Charmed
 The Cleaner (Primeval), a fictional character in the TV series Primeval
 The Cleaner (The X-Files), a fictional character in the TV series The X-Files
 The Cleaner (American TV series), a 2008 series starring Benjamin Bratt
 The Cleaner (British TV series), a 2021 BBC comedy series starring Greg Davies

Music
 Cleaner (band), a German electronic music group

Software
 Cleaner, a video-editing software package created by Media 100 and later sold to Autodesk
CCleaner, a utility used to clean potentially unwanted files and invalid Windows Registry entries from a computer

Other uses
 Cleaner (crime), a person who cleans up evidence of a crime
 Cleaner fish, fish that remove dead skin and parasites from other fish

See also
Mr. Clean
Fixer (disambiguation)
Hitman (disambiguation)